Rain Dogs is a British comedy-drama series created, written, and executive produced by Cash Carraway for BBC One and HBO. It stars Daisy May Cooper, Jack Farthing, Ronkẹ Adékoluẹjo and Fleur Tashjian. The show premiered on HBO on 6 March 2023 and is available to stream on HBO Max.

Synopsis
An unconventional love story between a working-class single mum, her young daughter, and a privileged gay man.

Cast

Episodes

Production
Rain Dogs is executive produced by Cash Carraway, Lee Morris, Sally Woodward Gentle, and Jo McLellan for BBC One. The series is directed by Richard Laxton and Jennifer Perrott.

Filming
Principal photography took place in Bristol at The Bottle Yard Studios as well as in North Somerset and Gloucestershire. Filming was reported to have wrapped by October 2022.

Broadcast
The series is expected to air on BBC One and iPlayer in 2023. A first trailer for the show was released in February 2023.

The series premiered on HBO on 6 March 2023 and will be available to stream on HBO Max.

References

External links

2023 British television series debuts
2020s British comedy television series 
2020s British drama television series
2020s British television miniseries
HBO original programming
BBC television dramas
English-language television shows
Television shows set in London
Television shows shot in Bristol
2020s British comedy-drama television series
Television series by BBC Studios
Television series by Home Box Office